Sung Hyun-ah (born July 23, 1975) is a South Korean actress and former Miss Korea.

Biography
Sung Hyun-ah placed second runner-up (or third place) at the Miss Korea pageant in 1994. She was the country's representative at the 1994 Miss International pageant, where she was a semi-finalist and won Miss Photogenic.

Sung made her acting debut in Salut D'Amour, and continued to appear in TV dramas such as See and See Again (also known as Can't Take My Eyes Off You), Should My Tears Show, Hur Jun, One Day Suddenly, Bad Woman, Good Woman, Yi San, and Flames of Desire. She also released an EP in 2004 titled Turn It Up under the name A.One.

But Sung became best known for her strong, sexy roles in films such as Hong Sang-soo's Woman is the Future of Man, Kim Tae-eun's The Intimate, and Kim Ki-duk's Time. She also appeared in The Scarlet Letter and The Customer Is Always Right. In 2007 Sung won the Best Actress award from the Malaga International Fantastic Film Festival in Spain, for her role in the horror film Cello.

No stranger to controversy, Sung was caught for using the drug ecstasy in 2002, and previously published a book containing nude photographs of herself. In 2006, a dispute broke out between Sung and the producers of the movie The Intimate when she protested against their marketing strategy to emphasize only the nude scenes. Sung said, "I filmed the nude scenes to make a good movie. I can't bear to see that such scenes are being used as tools for promotion. I am not an actress who undresses and tumbles about for no reason." She declared that from then on, she would avoid nude scenes altogether.

She married businessman Heo Eun-gyo on December 9, 2007 at the Paradise Hotel in Busan. After she and Heo divorced in 2010, Sung remarried three months later and gave birth to a son in 2012.

In December 2013, Sung was indicted on charges of prostitution, for allegedly receiving  from a businessman surnamed Chae with whom she met up three times for sexual intercourse in 2010. She countersued to prove her innocence. But, February 18 2016, the Supreme Court ruled that she was innocent of prostitution charges, overturning the lower court's decision.

Filmography

Film
Time (2006)
The Customer Is Always Right (2006)
The Intimate (2005)
Cello (2005)
The Scarlet Letter (2004)
Woman is the Future of Man (2004)
Live or Die (2003)
Boss X-File (2002)
Hallelujah (1997)

Television drama
"Wave, Wave" (KBS, 2018)
Flames of Desire (MBC, 2010-2011)
Ja Myung Go (SBS, 2009)
Yi San (MBC, 2007–2008)
Bad Woman, Good Woman (MBC, 2007)
One Day Suddenly (SBS, 2006)
Open Drama Man and Woman "I'm Mr. Heidi and Married" (SBS, 2001)
Twins (KBS, 2001)
Lipstick (iTV, 2001)
MBC Best Theater "Train Heading to Kaikoura" (MBC, 2000)
Because of You (MBC, 2000)
Hur Jun (MBC, 1999-2000)
Should My Tears Show (MBC, 1999)
Crystal (SBS, 1999)
Advocate (MBC, 1998)
See and See Again (MBC, 1998-1999)
Kim Chang-wan's Three Stories (KBS, 1998)
Devotion (KBS, 1997)
70-Minute Dramas "가방을 든 남자" (SBS, 1997)
18 Years of Growing Up (SBS, 1996)
Exploration of Man (SBS, 1996)
LA Arirang (SBS, 1995-1996)
MBC Best Theater "Adelaide" (MBC, 1995)
Salut D'Amour (KBS2, 1994)

Variety show
Scandal 2.0 (tvN, 2009)
Catch-One's World of Film (Catch-One, 1999)
진상을 찾아라 (HBS, 1997)
세상체험, 온몸을 던져라 (SBS, 1997)
행운의 일요특급 (KBS, 1995)
명사 가요초대석 (MBC, 1995)

Discography

Awards
2007 10th Malaga International Fantastic Film Festival: Best Actress (Cello)
1994 34th Miss International Pageant: Miss Photogenic
1994 38th Miss Korea Pageant: 2nd Runner-up

References

External links

1975 births
South Korean film actresses
South Korean television actresses
Miss International 1994 delegates
Living people
Miss Korea delegates
South Korean criminals
People acquitted of crimes